Waterside Shops is an open-air mall located on Tamiami Trail in Pelican Bay, Florida, just to the north of Naples, Florida. Opened in November 1992, the mall features Saks Fifth Avenue as the anchor tenant. The mall opened with 85% of its retail space leased. Since 2003, the mall has been managed by the Southfield, Michigan-based Forbes Company, which also operates several other upscale malls in Michigan and Florida. Its open-air concourses feature waterfalls and landscaping. Some of the more popular stores the mall has are Gucci, Louis Vuitton, Tesla, Rolex, and among others.

In May 2020, it was revealed that Nordstrom would be closing this location permanently as part of a plan to close 16 locations nationwide. This will leave Saks Fifth Avenue as the only anchor store left. Von Maur may replace the vacant spot.

Anchors
Current:
 Saks Fifth Avenue {original tenant} (expanded in 2008) (1992–present)  
Former:
 Jacobson's {original tenant} (closed in 2002 and redeveloped for Nordstrom in 2008) (1980-1991)
 Nordstrom (closed in 2020) (2008-2020)

Junior anchors
 Barnes & Noble {original tenant} (1992-present)

References

External links
Official Homepage

Shopping districts and streets in the United States
Shopping malls in Florida
Buildings and structures in Collier County, Florida
Tourist attractions in Collier County, Florida
Taubman Centers
Shopping malls established in 1992
1992 establishments in Florida